James Gamble may refer to:

James Gamble (industrialist) (1803–1891), U.S.-based Irish soapmaker and industrialist; co-founder of Procter & Gamble Company
James Gamble (congressman) (1809–1883), U.S. Representative from Pennsylvania
James Gamble (telegraph) (18??- ?), Piedmont resident, and builder of the first telegraph in California
James Sykes Gamble (1847–1925), English botanist 
James Fulton Gamble, Northern Irish politician